Trochoideomyces is a genus of fungi in the family Laboulbeniaceae. A monotypic genus, it contains the single species Trochoideomyces gracilicaulis.

References

External links
Trochoideomyces at Index Fungorum

Laboulbeniomycetes
Monotypic Laboulbeniomycetes genera